Spiranthinae is an orchid subtribe in the tribe Cranichideae.

Genera accepted in Chase et al.'s 2015 updated classification of orchids:

Other genera
 Microthelys
 Potosia

See also
 Taxonomy of the Orchidaceae

References

 
Orchid subtribes